Baghdad attack may refer to:

1950–51 Baghdad bombings
2003 Canal Hotel bombing
2003 Baghdad DHL attempted shootdown incident
2003 Jordanian embassy bombing in Baghdad
2004 Ashura bombings in Iraq, including Baghdad
June 2004 Baghdad bombing
14 September 2004 Baghdad bombing
30 September 2004 Baghdad bombing
17 August 2005 Baghdad bombings
14 September 2005 Baghdad bombings
2006 Buratha mosque bombing 
1 July 2006 Sadr City bombing
23 November 2006 Sadr City bombings
2007 Mustansiriya University bombings
22 January 2007 Baghdad bombings
3 February 2007 Baghdad market bombing
12 February 2007 Baghdad bombings
18 February 2007 Baghdad bombings
29 March 2007 Baghdad bombings
2007 Iraqi Parliament bombing
18 April 2007 Baghdad bombings
19 June 2007 al-Khilani Mosque bombing
26 July 2007 Baghdad market bombing
1 August 2007 Baghdad bombings
1 February 2008 Baghdad bombings
6 March 2008 Baghdad bombing
17 June 2008 Baghdad bombing
28 September 2008 Baghdad bombings
8 March 2009 Baghdad police recruitment centre bombing
6 April 2009 Baghdad bombings
23 April 2009 Iraqi suicide attacks
24 June 2009 Baghdad bombing
19 August 2009 Baghdad bombings
25 October 2009 Baghdad bombings
8 December 2009 Baghdad bombings
25 January 2010 Baghdad bombings
1 February 2010 Baghdad bombing
4 April 2010 Baghdad bombings
6 April 2010 Baghdad bombings
April 2010 Baghdad bombings
10 May 2010 Iraq attacks
20 June 2010 Baghdad bombings
July 2010 Baghdad bombing
17 August 2010 Baghdad bombings
19 September 2010 Baghdad attacks
2010 Baghdad church massacre
2 November 2010 Baghdad bombings
24 January 2011 Iraq bombings, including Baghda
27 January 2011 Baghdad bombing
28 August 2011 Baghdad bombing
October 2011 Baghdad bombings
22 December 2011 Baghdad bombings
5 January 2012 Iraq bombings
27 January 2012 Baghdad bombing
23 February 2012 Iraq attacks, including Baghdad
13 June 2012 Iraq attacks, including Baghdad
9 September 2012 Iraq attacks, including Baghdad
19 March 2013 Iraq attacks
18 April 2013 Baghdad bombing
27 May 2013 Baghdad bombings
21 September 2013 Iraq attacks, centering in Baghdad
2013 Iraq Christmas Day bombings, Baghdad
February 2015 Baghdad bombings
2015 Baghdad market truck bombing
January 2016 Iraq attacks
February 2016 Baghdad bombings
April 2016 Baghdad bombing
11 May 2016 Baghdad bombings
17 May 2016 Baghdad bombings
2016 Karrada bombing
9 September 2016 Baghdad bombings
October 2016 Baghdad attacks
December 2016 Baghdad bombings
January 2017 Baghdad bombings
Al-Faqma ice cream parlor bombing
January 2018 Baghdad bombings
2019-20 Attack on the United States embassy in Baghdad
2020 Camp Taji attacks, north of Baghdad

See also
Baghdad bombing (disambiguation)
Siege of Baghdad (1258)
Battle of Baghdad (2003)